The Eternal Feminine is a 1931 British drama film directed by Arthur Varney and starring Guy Newall, Doria March and Jill Esmond. It was made at Twickenham Studios. Its title refers to the psychological archetype of the eternal feminine.

Cast
 Guy Newall as Sir Charles Winthrop
 Doria March as Yvonne de la Roche
 Jill Esmond as Claire Lee
 Garry Marsh as Arthur Williams
 Terence de Marney as Michael Winthrop
 Madge Snell as Lady Winthrop
 Arthur Varney as Al Peters

References

Bibliography
 Low, Rachael. Filmmaking in 1930s Britain. George Allen & Unwin, 1985.
 Wood, Linda. British Films, 1927-1939. British Film Institute, 1986.

External links
 

1931 films
British drama films
1931 drama films
Films shot at Twickenham Film Studios
Films directed by Arthur Varney
British black-and-white films
1930s English-language films
1930s British films